Volley Gonzaga Milano or simply Gonzaga Milano was a male volleyball club from Milan, Italy.

History
The club was founded in 1973 as Volley Gonzaga from the merger of several clubs, including the internal private Institute "Gonzaga", then Italian champion in juniors, and CSI Milano, who had played in Serie A in the fifties and sixties and that he had then moved its headquarters first in Vigevano and then to Pavia. The team debuted in the top division in the 1976–77 season, making his last appearance in 1995; in 1987 the team under the name Ener-Mix Milano (for sponsorship reasons) had won its first European title, the then called CEV Cup, won in the final against Santal Parma.

The following season, 1987–88, the team ended the tournament on the bottom of the standings. In the summer of 1988 it was purchased by the Fininvest Group, which was planning to build a large sports club ("Polisportiva Mediolanum")  with the football giant of A.C. Milan and teams of ice hockey, basketball, baseball and rugby. The team was fished out in A1 Series for the renunciation of Pallavolo Mantova, but the ambitious targets that management had set did not arrive; after the victory of the only prestigious trophy, the CEV Cup Winners' Cup in 1993, won in the final against the French Cannes, and after two championships lost in the play-off finals (1992–93 and 1993–94) and two FIVB Volleyball Men's Club World Championships, the Fininvest left, in 1995. The club, overwhelmed by financial problems, sold it to MTA Padua rights to share in the A1 Series, demoted in Serie B2.

A new project to bring to the Milan summit volley was launched in 1999 with the purchase of the company, a militant in Serie A2, by the entrepreneur Antonio Caserta, former president of Asystel Volley Novara, which broke away from the club ' Gonzaga institute to create the Volley Milano.

Meanwhile, in 1998, the Gonzaga Institute again as Gonzaga Volleyball Young focusing mainly on the youth sector.

Honours and achievements

Domestic competitions
Italian League
 Runners-up (2): 1992–93, 1993–94

European competitions
CEV Cup Winners' Cup
 Winners (1): 1992–93
 Runners-up (2): 1991–92, 1993–94
CEV Cup
 Winners (1): 1986–87
 Runners-up (1): 1983–84

Worldwide competitions
FIVB Volleyball Men's Club World Championship
 Winners (1): 1990, 1992

External links
 Club site

References

Italian volleyball clubs
Sport in Milan
Volleyball clubs established in 1973
Fininvest
1973 establishments in Italy